Slide climbing is a type of hiking or mountaineering popular mainly in the Adirondack Mountains in the USA. It focuses on using the region's multitude of "slides", which are areas where the soil and growth have been washed away in a landslide, leaving a strip of bedrock. These slides have a wide variation in type, which could be as short as a few hundred feet to over a mile long, and as gradual as the hiking trails in the area to the point where they can accurately be described as cliffs.

The activity gained much of its popularity after Hurricane Irene in 2011, where the downpour in the High Peaks region caused many slides to expand and appear. However, using slides as means of climbing mountains probably goes back as far as the exploration and mapping of the area in the mid- to late-1800s. In addition to the sport of simply climbing the slides, others use them as a way to summit the peak (despite the rough bushwhack they may require to get on or off the slide), or for the purpose of backcountry skiing towards middle to late winter when the snow has accumulated.

Despite its popularity among a group of dedicated hikers, it is inherently dangerous. A slip or fall could leave one dead or injured hours away from help. As such, many climbers choose to learn on easier slides first, such as the Bennie's Brook Slide on Lower Wolfjaw, and work their way up to more difficult and demanding slides. They typically require the use of rock shoes at the least, with climbing helmet, harnesses, ropes and belay devices also being necessary, with crampons or skis/snowshoes in the winter with ice protection as well, on the more difficult slides, such as the East Face Slide on Mount Marcy. While some are very easy to find and exit, others require extensive skill in backcountry navigation and an intimate knowledge of the area.

See also 
 Rock climbing
 Adirondack Forty-Sixers

References 

Adirondack Park
Types of climbing